Ricky Andrew Shaw (born July 28, 1966 in Westchester, New York) is a retired American football linebacker in the National Football League for the New York Giants and the Philadelphia Eagles.  He played college football at Oklahoma State University and was drafted in the fourth round of the 1988 NFL Draft. He is now a physical education coach at Orange Youth Academy in Orlando, Florida.  Shaw works with young men who are in a residential facility operated by Florida Department of Juvenile Justice.

References

1965 births
Living people
People from Westchester County, New York
American football linebackers
Oklahoma State Cowboys football players
New York Giants players
Philadelphia Eagles players